Gákkajávri is a lake that lies in Porsanger Municipality in Troms og Finnmark county, Norway. The  lake lies just east of the European route E06 highway, between the villages of Lakselv and Karasjok.

The village of Skoganvarre and the lake Øvrevann, popular tourist areas, are located on the west side of the lake. In the winter time, this area is a popular setting-off point for ski- and snow scooter activities. In the south, there is a small power station and Porsanger's largest housing estate.

References

Porsanger
Lakes of Troms og Finnmark